Guadalupe Maravilla, formerly known as Irvin Morazan (born 1976) is a transdisciplinary visual artist, choreographer, and healer. At the age of eight, Maravilla was part of the first wave of unaccompanied, undocumented children to arrive at the United States border in the 1980s as a result of the Salvadoran Civil War. In 2016, Maravilla became a U.S. citizen and adopted the name Guadalupe Maravilla in solidarity with his undocumented father, who uses Maravilla as his last name. As an acknowledgment to his past, Maravilla grounds his practice in the historical and contemporary contexts belonging to undocumented communities and the cancer community. 
 Combining pre-colonial Central American ancestry, personal mythology, and collaborative performative acts, Maravilla’s performances, objects, and drawings trace the history of his own displacement and that of others. Culling the entangled fictional and autobiographical genealogies of border crossing accounts, Maravilla nurtures collective narratives of trauma into celebrations of perseverance and humanity. Across all media, Maravilla explores how the systemic abuse of immigrants physically manifests in the body, reflecting on his own battle with cancer, which began in his gut. Maravilla’s large-scale sculptures, titled Disease Throwers, function as headdresses, instruments, and shrines through the incorporation of materials collected from sites across Central America, anatomical models, and sonic instruments such as conch shells and gongs. These Disease Throwers ultimately serve as symbols of renewal, generating therapeutic, vibrational sound. 

His work is in the permanent collections of the Museum of Modern Art, New York; the Whitney Museum of American Art, New York; Museo Nacional Centro de Arte Reina Sofía, Madrid; and the Institute of Contemporary Art, Miami. Additionally, he has performed and presented his work at the Whitney Museum of American Art, New York; the Museum of Modern Art, New York; the Metropolitan Museum of Art, New York; the Institute of Contemporary Art, Miami; Queens Museum, New York; The Bronx Museum of the Arts, New York; El Museo del Barrio, New York; Museum of Art of El Salvador, San Salvador; X Central American Biennial, Costa Rica; New York;, Shelley & Donald Rubin Foundation, New York; and the Drawing Center, New York, among others.

Early life and education 
Irvin Morazan was born in El Salvador in 1976. Maravilla was in a boy band in El Salvador from when he was 6 to 8 years old that toured Central America. Maravilla often played on the steps of the pyramids in El Salvador and spent his early childhood drawing and creating sculptures.

In 1984, Maravilla crossed the border into Texas alone escorted by a coyote to escape the Salvadorian Civil War. Maravilla and his family later arrived in New York City where he started attending art school and exploring different aspects of New York culture, like hip-hop. He was undocumented until he became a US citizen at 27 years old. 
 
Maravilla was the first in his family to go to college. He received his BFA in 2003 from the School of Visual Arts where he studied photography and later received a MFA in sculpture from Hunter College in 2013.

Art 
Maravilla's practice combines indigenous traditions with urban culture. He often makes sculptural headdresses that mimic pre-Columbian dress, which serve as costumes in his performances. In 2011, Maravilla performed Crossing Performance at the Mexico-United States border. Maravilla wore a tall, spiky headdress fusing Mayan and futuristic imagery while swimming across the Rio Grande. The headdress contained a large solar reflector that reflected the sun's light, drawing the attention of Border Patrol agents. 
 
Maravilla's work is largely inspired by his childhood experience of emigrating to the United States. In 2016, Irvin Morazan changed his name to Guadalupe Maravilla as a gesture of solidarity with his undocumented father—who uses Maravilla as his last name in his fake identity. The el coyote—or border-crossing agent—is featured in his overall work. The sculptural work Border Crossing Headdress is Maravilla's interpretation of the coyote, made using soil from the American-Mexican border region.

Maravilla has staged multiple large-scale performances incorporating hip-hop, theater, sculpture, sound, video, and photography. His performance BOOM! BOOM! WHAMMM! SWOOSH!(2017) consisted of him directing a feminist motorcycle gang inside the Texas State Capitol parking garage. Maravilla conducted over thirty immigrant performers. The participants included quinceñeras, Tibetan throat singers, and immigrants with disabilities.

In 2018, Maravilla collaborated with undocumented immigrants to create 10 drawings alongside a 42 ft mural. Participants drew onto digital manipulations of the Historia Tolteca-Chichimeca (c. 1550), a colonial Mexican manuscript that combines Nahua pictorial writing with European conventions of the historical annal. The lines are drawn based a Salvadoran game called Tripa Chuca, in which participants draw lines connecting pairs of matching numbers distributed across the page without crossing over previously drawn paths.

In 2019 Maravilla began the series, Disease Throwers, free-standing mixed-media sculptures that reflect the various indigenous healing practices that the artist explored during a long bout with cancer. These sculptures incorporate gongs and can be activated by performers to create sound baths, a healing therapy Maravilla staged for groups during 2020 exhibitions at PPOW gallery and Socrates Sculpture Park.

Selected exhibitions

Solo exhibitions 
 Guadalupe Maravilla: Tierra Blanca Joven, Brooklyn Museum of Art, Brooklyn,NY (2022)
 Guadalupe Maravilla: Luz y Fuerza, Museum of Modern Art, New York (2021)

  Planeta Abuelx, Socrates Sculpture Park, Queens, NY (2021)
  Seven Ancestral Stomachs, PPOW, New York, NY (2021)
  Spirit Level, Creative Time, NY (Postponed)(2020)
  Disease Thrower, Knockdown Center, Performance (Canceled)(2020)
  Walk on Water performance, Queens Museum, Queens, NY (2019)
  Disease Thrower, ICA Museum, Richmond, Virginia (2019)
  Portals, ICA Museum, Miami (2019)
  Saga, Jack Barrett Gallery, New York (2019)
  OG of the Undocumented Children Performance, Whitney Museum of American Art(2018)
  BOOM BOOM WHAMM SWOOSH performance, Fusebox Festival, Houston, Texas (2017)
  XOLO Yawning, Y Gallery, New York, NY (2015)
  Temple, DCKT Gallery, New York, NY (2011)
  Return Of Xipe Totec, Jack the Pelican presents, Brooklyn, NY (2008)
  The Neighbors, part three: Love Thy Neighbor, Bronx Museum of the Arts, Bronx (2017)
 Xolo Yawning, Y Gallery, New York (2016)
 Temple of the Bearded Man, DCKT Contemporary, New York (2011)

Group exhibitions/performances 

 Pacha, Llaqta, Wasichay: Indigenous Space, Modern Architecture, New Art, Whitney Museum of American Art, New York, NY (2018)
 FIRST WE TAKE MANHATTAN, Ethan Cohen New York, NY (2016)
 The Magus Performance, Metropolitan Museum of Art, NY (2014)
 10, an exhibition celebrating MARTE Contemporary's 10 year anniversary, Museo de Arte de El Salvador (MARTE) and MARTE Contemporary (MARTE-C), San Salvador (2014)
 Tandem in Pursuits: Armor & Ichthyology, Bronx, NY (2012)
 9th Annual BRONX RIVER Sights & SOUNDS Festival, Bronx River Art Center, Bronx, NY (2012)
 Performa 11, The Dating Game, El Museo Del Barrio, NY (2011)
 I Didn't Cross the Border, the Border Crossed Me, Museum of Contemporary Native Arts, Santa Fe, NM (2010)
 Hair Tactics, Jersey City Museum, Jersey City, NJ (2010)

Awards 
 Joan Mitchell Fellowship (2021)
 Lise Wilhelmsen Art award (2021)
 LatinX Fellowship (2021)
 Guggenheim Memorial Foundation Fellowship (2019)
 Map Fund Grant (2019)
 Soros Art Fellowship; Art, Migration & Public Space (2019)
 Franklin Furnace (2018)
 Art Matters Fellowship (2017)
 Virginia Museum of Fine Arts Fellowship (2017)
 Latinx Artist Fellowship (2021)
 Creative Capital Emerging Fields Award (2016)
 Virginia Commonwealth University Fountainhead Fellowship (2014)
 Dedalus Foundation Fellowship (2013)
 Art Matters Grant (2012)
 Cisneros Foundation Grant (2012)
 Robert Mapplethorpe Award, Robert Mapplethorpe Foundation (2003)

References

External links 
 Official Website
 Profile at Creative Capital

Living people
American contemporary artists
American performance artists
21st-century American artists
Salvadoran emigrants to the United States
1976 births